Albert Edward Howarth Blakey (9 November 1879 – 4 July 1935) was an Australian politician. Born in Balmoral, Victoria, he received a primary education before becoming a clerk, and an official with the Clerks' Union. Blakely also served as secretary of the Hamilton branch of the ALP and a member of the board of directors of the Australian Natives' Association. In 1906 he served as a member of the central executive of the Victorian ALP.

In 1910, he was elected to the Australian Senate as a Labor Senator for Victoria. He was defeated in 1917, and died in Mooroopna in 1935 after a long illness.

The Age called him a good platform speaker and referred to his genial personality.

References

Australian Labor Party members of the Parliament of Australia
Members of the Australian Senate for Victoria
Members of the Australian Senate
1879 births
1935 deaths
20th-century Australian politicians